Huangdian (黄店镇) may refer to the following locations in China:

 Huangdian, Henan, town in Zhongmu County
 Huangdian, Shandong, town in Dingtao County
 Huangdian, Zhejiang, town in Lanxi